Ardene ər-deen, är-deen is a family-owned value fashion retailer based in Montreal, Quebec, Canada. Founded in the early 1980s, Ardene started as an accessories and jewelry retailer, and has since added clothing, shoes, brand collaborations and licensed apparel into its product mix.

The company operates close to 350 stores in Canada, the United States and the Middle East, and occupies over 2.25 million square feet of retail space globally. The company employs approximately 3,500 people across North America.

New concept store 
The company started introducing larger stores (20,000 sq ft) in early 2017.

eCommerce 
Ardene.com launched in October 2017.

International expansion

United States
In 2015, the company opened its first store in the United States. As of 2022, Ardene operates stores in New York, New Jersey, Connecticut, Pennsylvania, Virginia, Massachusetts, Maryland, Rhode Island and Florida.

Middle East
Ardene opened its first Middle East store in April 2016 under a licensed partnership. Today, the company has stores 12 stores in GCC countries.

Sub-brands 
Ardene sells a vast assortment of apparel, shoes, and accessories for girls and women and most recently, for men. Since 2015, the company has introduced clothing lines such as:

 MOVE activewear,
 Rose + Vine lingerie,
 A.C.W. contemporary wear,
 82 North outerwear, 
 a.co beauty, 
 Ardene Occasion, 
 Ardene Home,
 Swimwear, 
 Basics collection,
 Ardene Curve plus size clothing in select stores.
 Ardene Man

In 2019, the company launched an eco conscious collection under the name Ardene Collective.

Ardene Foundation 
The company also operates the Ardene Foundation, a charity organization focused on community initiatives and social responsibility. The Foundation regularly partners with local and international non-profits and has surpassed $5.7M in charitable donations since its official inception in 2013. The company lists community and responsibility as two of its values and published on its website that it upholds strict ethical codes of conduct for its employees and international suppliers. The company has a no incineration policy for deadstock and donates its post season merchandise through the Ardene Foundation.

External links

 
 Ardene Corporate
 Ardène ouvre un magasin grande surface à St-Jérôme
 Ardene Launches Large Format Retail Concept [Photos]
 Retail in brief: Ardene’s new millennial layout
 Kendall and Kylie in Deal With Ardene of Canada
 EXCLUSIVE: Kendall & Kylie Jenner Are Launching a Capsule Collection With Ardene
 Kendall and Kylie Jenner's New Swimsuit Collection Is So Sexy, It Already Got Ben Simmons's Attention

Clothing retailers of Canada
Companies based in Montreal
Canadian companies established in 1982